Patricia Chepkwemoi (born 1994) is a Ugandan long-distance runner.

At the 2015 World Cross Country Championships she finished 30th in the senior race and won a bronze medal in the team competition. She finished fourth at the 2018 World Mountain Running Championships.

References

1994 births
Living people
Ugandan female long-distance runners
Ugandan female cross country runners
20th-century Ugandan women
21st-century Ugandan women